Teresa Enríquez (d. 1529), was a Spanish courtier.

She was married to Gutierre de Cárdenas. 

Her spouse was the courtier of Ferdinand II of Aragon, and she was the lady-in-waiting of Isabella I of Castile. She was an influential figure at court. She became known for her building projects and philanthropy. 

She is known for her care for the injured during the conquest of Granada in 1492.

References

1529 deaths
Spanish ladies-in-waiting
15th-century Spanish women
16th-century Spanish women
Isabella I of Castile